Gloeoporus is a genus of crust fungi in the family Irpicaceae. The genus has a widespread distribution.

Taxonomy
Gloeoporus was created by French mycologist Camille Montagne in 1842 to contain the subtropical species Gloeoporus conchoides. The fungus is now known as Gloeoporus thelephoroides.

Although traditionally classified in the family Meruliaceae, molecular phylogenetic analysis supports the placement of Gloeoporus  in the Irpicaceae. A recent (2018) revision of the taxonomic status and generic limits of Gloeoporus using molecular phylogenetics revealed a polyphyletic genus, and the subsequent transfer of some species to Meruliopsis.

Description
Gloeoporus fungi have pore surfaces featuring a pinkish white, cream, or orange to deep reddish colour. The pores are small. The texture of the fruit bodies  surface is gelatinous when fresh, but becomes resinous and cartilaginous when dry.

Species

, Index Fungorum accepts 30 species in Gloeoporus:

Some cystidium-forming species formerly placed in Gloeoporus were transferred to Meruliopsis in 2018 based on molecular phylogenetic analysis, including Gloeoporus guerreroanus and Gloeoporus cystidiatus. They join Meruliopsis taxicola, which was also once referred to Gloeoporus because of its morphological similarities with Gloeoporus dichrous.

References

Irpicaceae
Polyporales genera
Taxa described in 1842
Taxa named by Camille Montagne